John Whittocksmead (fl. 1399–1410) of Bath, Somerset, was an English politician.

He was a Member (MP) of the Parliament of England for Bath in 1399, 1402, 1407 and 1410.

References

14th-century births
15th-century deaths
English MPs 1399
English MPs 1402
People from Bath, Somerset
English MPs 1407
English MPs 1410